Bob Lynn (February 23, 1933 – May 25, 2020) was an American politician who served as a Republican member of the Alaska House of Representatives, representing the 31st district from 2003 to 2013 and the 26th district from 2013 to 2017. He served as Chair of the State Affairs Committee, was Vice-Chair of the Judiciary Committee, and was a member of the Transportation Committee and Joint Armed Forces Committees.  He also served on the Labor & Workforce Development, Military & Veterans' Affairs, and Public Safety Finance Subcommittees, for the 28th Legislature. Bob Lynn is a retired fighter pilot with the United States Air Force and a Vietnam Veteran.

Alaska Legislature
During the 2011-2012 legislative session, Lynn chaired the State Affairs Committee in the Alaska House.

Elections
2012 Lynn won the November 6, 2012 General election with 63% of the vote against Democratic nominee Lupe Marroquin.
2014 Lynn won the November 4, 2014 General election with 67% of the vote against Democratic nominee Bill Goodell.
2016 In the August 15th Republican primary, Lynn was defeated 59-31% by Chris Birch, who went on to win the election.

Personal life
Lynn and his wife Marlene (née Wagner) have six children, and twenty-one grandchildren. Lynn was born in East Los Angeles, California, where he graduated from the Garfield High School. He received a Bachelor of Arts from University of Arizona, and received a Master of Arts from California State University, Long Beach. He was also a graduate of the "Education with Industry" program of the Air University. He served as mayor pro-tem and city councilman of the City of Moreno Valley, Riverside County, California, and was instrumental in the founding of that city in 1984.

He died on May 25, 2020, at age 87. On May 26, 2020 Alaska Governor Mike Dunleavy ordered flags to be flown at half staff on May 27 and May 28 in Lynn's honor.

References

External links
 Bob Lynn at 100 Years of Alaska's Legislature

1933 births
2020 deaths
21st-century American politicians
American city founders
California city council members
California State University, Long Beach alumni
Republican Party members of the Alaska House of Representatives
Military personnel from California
Politicians from Anchorage, Alaska
People from East Los Angeles, California
People from Moreno Valley, California
University of Arizona alumni